Maria Clotilde of Savoy (Ludovica Teresa Maria Clotilde; 2 March 1843 – 25 June 1911) was born in Turin to Vittorio Emanuele II, later King of Italy and his first wife, Adelaide of Austria. She was the wife of Prince Napoléon-Jérôme Bonaparte. She is venerated in the Catholic Church, having been declared Servant of God by Pope Pius XII.

Early life and ancestry
Maria Clotilde was the eldest of eight children born to Victor Emmanuel II, King of Sardinia by his first wife and cousin, Archduchess Adelaide of Austria. Her father would later become the King of a united Italy as Victor Emmanuel II.

Maria Clotilde's paternal grandparents were Charles Albert, King of Sardinia and Archduchess Maria Theresa of Austria.

Her maternal grandparents were Archduke Rainer of Austria and Princess Elisabeth of Savoy. Rainer was a younger son of Leopold II, Holy Roman Emperor.

Marriage

On 30 January 1859 she was married in Turin to Prince Napoléon-Jérôme Bonaparte (1822–1891). They had three children:

Princess Napoléon
Their marriage was unhappy, particularly as Maria Clotilde preferred the quieter, more duty-filled life that she felt they should maintain, while Napoléon-Jérôme preferred the faster, more entertainment-filled lifestyle of the French Court. Another factor in their unhappy marriage were the circumstances leading up to their espousal. Maria Clotilde had been only 15 when they were married, while he had been over 37 years old. In the events leading up to their marriage, she had been vehemently against it, and had unhappily agreed to it. The marriage had also been negotiated out of political reasons during the conference of Plombières (July 1858). As Maria Clotilde was too young at the time for marriage, Napoléon-Jérôme had had to wait until the following year; many had disapproved of the speed he undertook collecting his young bride in Turin. Their marriage was often compared to that of an elephant and a gazelle; the bridegroom had strong Napoleonic features (broad, bulky, and ponderous) while the bride appeared frail, short, fair-haired, and with the characteristic nose of the House of Savoy.

Her husband was unfaithful, and she was active within charities. Maria Clotilde was described as very proud, bigoted and dutiful. During a discussion of the proper way of dressing, Maria Clotide pointed out to Empress Eugenie that she should not forget that she was born and raised in a Royal Court. When Eugenie complained of the fatigue of the French Court on one occasion, Maria Clotilde replied "We do not mind; you see, we are born to it". She was also described however as "pious and modest".

The marriage was also unpopular with both the French and the Italians; the latter in particular felt that the daughter of their King had been sacrificed to an unpopular member of the House of Bonaparte and consequently regarded it as a mésalliance. For France's part, Napoléon-Jérôme was ill-regarded and had been known to carry on a number of affairs both before and during his marriage. Their official reception into Paris on 4 February was greeted very coldly by Parisians, not out of disrespect for a daughter of the King of Savoy, but instead out of dislike for her new husband. Indeed, all her life, public sympathy tended to lean in her favor; she was fondly regarded as retiring, charitable, pious, and trapped in an unhappy marriage.

With her husband, she traveled to the United States in 1861 and to Egypt and the Holy Land in 1863. While in the United States, she traveled on the newly completed main line of the Illinois Central Railroad, where the village of Savoy, Illinois was named in her honor.

Fall of French Empire
After the fall of the Second French Empire in 1870, Maria Clotilde had initially refused to leave Paris when the revolution broke out, because of her sense of what was suitable for a Princess from the House of Savoy, which was to stay on her post. They were forced to flee, however, and their family enjoyed a beautiful estate in the town of Prangins near Lake Geneva that they resided in.

Turin
After Maria Clotilde's father Victor Emmanuel died in 1878, she returned to Turin, Italy without her husband. During this period, their daughter (Maria Letizia) mostly resided with her mother in the Castle of Moncalieri, but her two sons stayed mainly with their father. It was in Italy that their mother withdrew herself from society to dedicate herself to religion and various charities.

After the revolution, she lived the rest of her life in Moncalieri (located outside of Turin), where she spent her days devoting herself to religion. She lived in retirement from the world for the following twenty years, until her death. Maria Clotilde died in Moncalieri at the age of 68. She was buried there, and the funeral was given regal honors. It was attended by Victor Emmanuel III of Italy, Queen Elena, and others.

Cause of beatification and canonization 
On 1936 the cause of beatification Maria Clotilde was introduced by the Archbishop of Turin, On 10 July 1942 Pope Pius XII declared the princess a Servant of God and the cause of her beatification still continue.

Honours 
  :  Dame Grand Cross of the Order of Saints Maurice and Lazarus.
  :  Dame of the Order of the Starry Cross.

Ancestry

References

Sources

1843 births
1911 deaths
Italian people of Polish descent
Italian princesses
Princesses Napoléon
House of Bonaparte
Princesses of Savoy
Burials at the Basilica of Superga
Nobility from Turin
Dames of the Order of Saint Isabel
Italian Servants of God
19th-century venerated Christians
Roman Catholic royal saints
Victor Emmanuel II of Italy
Daughters of kings